New Deal is a Keynesian liberal and progressive political party in France. It was founded on 18 November 2013 by Pierre Larrouturou. Its stated aims are to renew how democracy is used, and it has social, ecological and economic goals, which could be defined as left-wing.

History
In the wake of the 2012 French presidential election, the "Collectif Roosevelt" was launched to promote 15 propositions to all the candidates, which had been signed into a manifesto by over 100,000 people. After François Hollande's victory, Pierre Larrouturou and Stéphane Hessel chose to put these ideas to vote within the Parti Socialiste (PS) at the Toulouse meeting, which was to elect the new leader of the party. However, their motion obtained only 11.78% of the votes, ranking it third.

Following these events, Pierre Larrouturou announced the creation of the New Deal party, effectively leaving the Socialist Party, on 28 November 2013. The party was named after the New Deal, the political program launched by Franklin D. Roosevelt in the 1930s to get the United States out of the Great Depression. New Deal has highlighted that very low economic growth in France has been the norm for a generation, and postulates that the crisis is the result of inequalities of economic redistribution, in terms of wealth and working time. For instance, it proposes the revision of fiscal policies and the division of labour, though reducing working time. Those policies would be sustained by Keynesian policies, based on ecological needs.

The party wants to unite citizens who have not previously been involved in politics, supporters of the Left Front, the Europe Ecology – The Greens, the Socialist Party (PS), The MoDem, people from social Gaullism, CEOs, as well as contingent workers, and French celebrities.

Political position
Nouvelle Donne is located in the political spectrum of the left wing, in the context of French politics, but it is sometimes described as the centre-left. This political party values political, conscientious, speech, and individual freedom, and supports social justice and environmentalism.

The New Deal is a representative of modern liberalism in the United States. Nouvelle Donne is also a social-liberal party. While in French politics social liberalism is generally classified as centrist, Nouvelle Donne is classified as more left-leaning than the Socialist Party, a centre-left party with a tendency to social democracy. The party can be seen as a party advocating progressivism, a left-wing form of liberalism.

Election results

European Parliament

See also
Political Parties of France
MoDem
Europe Ecology – The Greens
Social Gaullism
Left Front (France)
New Deal liberalism
Reiwa Shinsengumi, another liberal party classified as "left-wing".

References

External links
 

2013 establishments in France
Centre-left parties in Europe
Economic progressivism
European federalist parties
Left-wing parties in France
Liberal parties in France
Political parties in France
Political parties established in 2013
Pro-European political parties in France
Progressive parties
Social liberal parties